Virgilio Ferreira Romero (born 28 January 1973) is a retired Paraguayan footballer who played  as a midfielder.

He was Paraguayan international and represented the nation in two Copa América tournaments.

Honours

Club
Cerro Porteño
Primera División: 1990, 1992, 1994
Torneo República: 1991

LDU Quito
Serie A: 2003

Country
Copa América: 1993, 2001

External links
 
 
 Paraguay – Record International Players; at RSSSF
 
 

1973 births
Living people
Paraguayan footballers
Paraguay international footballers
Cerro Porteño players
Real Betis players
CF Extremadura footballers
Recreativo de Huelva players
Club América footballers
Club Libertad footballers
L.D.U. Quito footballers
The Strongest players
12 de Octubre Football Club players
C.D. Técnico Universitario footballers
Association football forwards